The 2003 Cork Senior Football Championship was the 115th staging of the Cork Senior Football Championship since its establishment by the Cork County Board in 1887. The draw for the opening fixtures took place on 8 December 2002. The championship began on 12 October 2003 and ended on 19 October 2003.

Nemo Rangers entered the championship as the defending champions, however, they were beaten by Na Piarsaigh in the third round.

On 19 October 2003, Castlehaven won the championship following a 1-09 to 1–07 defeat of Clonakilty in the final. This was their third championship title overall and their first title since 1994.

O'Donovan Rossa's Jurgen Werner was the championship's top scorer with 0-33.

Results

Preliminary round

First round

Second round

Third round

Fourth round

Quarter-finals

Semi-finals

Final

Championship statistics

Top scorers

Overall

In a single game

References

Cork Senior Football Championship
Cork Senior Football Championship